Forced Entry (also known as The Last Victim) is a 1975 American horror film by director Jim Sotos. The film is an PG-rated (Re-rated R later) remake of a 1973 pornographic horror film of the same name by director Shaun Costello.

Plot
A maniac with a history of child abuse takes to murdering women.

Cast
 Tanya Roberts - Nancy Ulman 
 Ron Max - Carl 
 Nancy Allen - Hitch Hiker 
 Michael Tucci - Richie
 Brian Freilino - Peter Ulman 
 Billy Longo - Charlie
 Glenn Scarpelli - Glenn Ulman

Home media
Harmony Vision released the film on VHS in the United States. In 2019, Dark Force Entertainment released the film on Blu-ray with two versions of the movie included on it, one using the title Forced Entry title and the other using the title The Last Victim. Neither version matches the VHS release, which contains quite a bit more footage in the sexual assault scenes.

References

External links
 
 
 

1975 films
1975 horror films
American horror films
American serial killer films
American crime thriller films
American rape and revenge films
Horror film remakes
Remakes of American films
1970s English-language films
Films directed by Jim Sotos
1970s American films